Martin Finger (born 16 December 1970) is a Czech actor.

Selected filmography

Film
 Walking Too Fast (2010)
 Long Live the Family! (2011)
 I, Olga Hepnarová (2016)
 Toman (2018)
 Metanol (2018)
 The Word (2022)

Television
 Ulice (2005)
 Spravedlnost (2017)
 Stockholm Syndrome (2020)
 Actor (2020)
 Božena (2021)
 Nineties (2022)

References

External links
 

1970 births
Living people
People from Šumperk
Czech male film actors
Czech male stage actors
Academy of Performing Arts in Prague alumni
Czech male television actors
21st-century Czech male actors
20th-century Czech male actors